B. Goldstein may refer to:
 Baruch Goldstein (1956–1994), Israeli physician and mass murderer
 Bernard R. Goldstein, historian of science
 Boris Goldstein (1922–1987), Soviet violin prodigy
 Bruce Goldstein (born 1951), American film programmer, producer, archivist, historian

See also
 Goldstein (surname)